Resident Evil 6 is a 2012 third-person shooter video game developed and published by Capcom. A major installment in the Resident Evil series, Resident Evil 6 was released for the PlayStation 3 and Xbox 360 in October 2012, and for Windows in March 2013. Players control Leon S. Kennedy, Chris Redfield, Jake Muller and Ada Wong as they confront the force behind a worldwide bio-terrorist attack. The story is centred around their four interwoven campaigns, and every campaign features a unique style in both tone and gameplay.

Resident Evil 6 was conceptualized in 2009 and entered full development the following year under Resident Evil 4 producer Hiroyuki Kobayashi. It had a development staff of more than 600, making it Capcom's largest production. Resident Evil 6 received mixed reviews from critics, who criticised the interwoven campaigns and departure from the survival horror roots of the franchise. Despite these criticisms, the game sold over 10 million copies. It was re-released with all downloadable content for the PlayStation 4 and Xbox One in March 2016, and for the Nintendo Switch in October 2019. Resident Evil 7: Biohazard, released in 2017, switched to a first-person perspective and returned to the survival horror genre.

Gameplay

Resident Evil 6 allows players to select between four scenarios with interwoven storylines centered on Division of Security Operations (DSO) agent Leon S. Kennedy, Bioterrorism Security Assessment Alliance (BSAA) Captain Chris Redfield, mercenary Jake Muller and spy Ada Wong. In the Leon, Chris and Jake scenarios, players have the option of controlling either them or their respective partners, United States Secret Service agent Helena Harper, BSAA sniper Piers Nivans and DSO agent Sherry Birkin. The character not selected by the player is controlled by either artificial intelligence (AI) or another player via local or online multiplayer. Ada's scenario can be played with or without a partner and a second player who joins will control the non-canonical character Agent. In addition, each scenario features a different play-style; for example, some player-characters are more vulnerable to attacks whereas others are more resilient. Each central character has unique abilities, which vary from faster reload times and carrying more ammunition. Resident Evil 6 presents new gameplay mechanics such as rolling in any direction and running while shooting and sliding. The game also features a four-player co-operative mode. When playing in single player mode, the player can allow another player to join in online at any time. While performing certain actions, quick time events may occur, in which the player must follow onscreen prompts by pressing buttons or manipulating joysticks within a limited amount of time.

A new feature comes in the form of tablets; players may consume them in order to recover health, and more can be produced by mixing herbs. If one player runs out of health, that player will have a short time to try to defend themselves while their partners attempt to revive them. If any non-AI players are killed, gameplay will resume at the last checkpoint. The game features several primary enemies, including zombies and the newly introduced J'avo. Unlike zombies, J'avo are able to interact with each other to plan an attack, use weapons and heal themselves. Also some J'avo are susceptible to various mutations that increase their prowess in battle, the type of mutation sometimes depends on location of the injury. There are a total of 15 different mutations within the game. Certain enemies drop skill points when killed, which can be picked up and spent on upgrades such as increased weapon effectiveness or specific ammunition drops. The campaigns feature a "Lone Wolf" ability which allows the player to remove their artificial intelligence companion character. Players can equip three of these upgrades which apply to all campaigns. The game also features a stamina bar; which depletes once the player performs melee attacks, or uses a "quickshot"—which involves shooting a zombie with a headshot instantly. Resident Evil 6 is twice as long as Resident Evil 5.

The game features two new modes. "Mercenaries" mode involves players fighting for survival against hordes of enemies. In the PC version, the Mercenaries mode features an exclusive sub-mode named "No Mercy", which involves the cast from Left 4 Dead 2 fighting a total number of 300 enemies against a timer. "Agent Hunt" mode allows players to take control of random enemies in other people's online sessions; however, it is only unlocked after the player clears the three main campaigns. The longer the player stays in another online session, the more points they will earn.

Plot

On 24 December 2012, Jake Muller (Troy Baker), son of late bio-terrorist Albert Wesker, flees local authorities during a bio-terrorist attack in Edonia. He partners with Division of Security Operations (DSO) agent and Raccoon City survivor Sherry Birkin (Eden Riegel) and learns that she is to extract him from the country to create a vaccine for the new C-virus. However, they are hunted by Ustanak, a hulking bio-weapon. Meanwhile, a Bio-terrorism Security Assessment Alliance (BSAA) strike team led by Chris Redfield (Roger Craig Smith) and Piers Nivans (Christopher Emerson) is deployed to combat the infected local populace. However, they are attacked by the leader of Neo-Umbrella, who refers to herself as Ada Wong (Courtenay Taylor); she kills most of the BSAA members, using a device that injects them with the C-virus, turning them into monsters, except Chris and Piers. Chris goes into a self-imposed exile, afflicted with post-traumatic amnesia. Meanwhile, Sherry and Jake's extraction by the BSAA is sabotaged, forcing them to crash into the mountains. They are captured by "Ada" for six months.

On 29 June 2013, US President Adam Benford (Michael Donovan) attempts to publicly reveal the truth behind the 1998 Raccoon City incident and the government's dealings with Umbrella, to end further bio-terrorist activity. However, the venue in the American town of Tall Oaks is hit by another attack, infecting the President; the sole survivors, DSO agent and Raccoon City survivor Leon S. Kennedy (Matthew Mercer) and United States Secret Service agent Helena Harper (Laura Bailey), are forced to kill him. The pair encounter the real Ada Wong (also Taylor), and Leon learns that National Security Advisor Derek Simmons (David Lodge) is affiliated with Neo-Umbrella and was responsible for the attack. Leon and Helena pursue Simmons into Lanshiang, China, while faking their deaths. Meanwhile, Jake and Sherry escape captivity in Lanshiang.

Chris returns to duty in the BSAA with Piers and a new team, arriving in a besieged Lanshiang. Chris recovers from his amnesia and seeks revenge against Ada, resulting in casualties for his squad. Chris and Piers confront "Ada", until Leon intervenes. After being informed by Leon, Chris and Piers pursue "Ada" to an aircraft carrier, destroying cruise missiles laden with the C-virus. Leon, Helena, Sherry and Jake confront Simmons over his involvement with the outbreaks, where Sherry covertly hands Jake's medical data to Leon in case of their captivity. Leon and Helena corner Simmons, who has been infected by a J'avo, where he confesses to having killed the President to maintain national security. The two see off a mutated Simmons while Sherry and Jake are captured again. Attempting to leave the city, Leon and Helena are warned by Chris that a missile carrying the C-virus has been launched, and its detonation unleashes an outbreak in the city. Leon discloses Jake's real identity to Chris and has him rescue Jake and Sherry in a remote oil platform. With Ada's assistance, Leon and Helena kill Simmons.

On the oil platform, Chris and Piers head underground, freeing Jake and Sherry from captivity before preventing a large-scale attack by a gigantic bioweapon, Haos. Heavily wounded and in a desperate attempt to save Chris, Piers injects himself with the C-virus to help turn the tide of the battle. He defeats Haos before evacuating. Aware that the mutation will worsen, Piers sacrifices himself by pushing Chris to an escape pod, using his abilities to destroy the base. Meanwhile, Jake and Sherry escape the facility and kill Ustanak as they ride a rocket-powered lift to the surface.

The imposter Ada was a scientist named Carla Radames, who was forced to transform into Ada by Simmons. The real Ada was aiding Leon and Sherry while destroying the Neo-Umbrella lab in Lanshiang. Although presumed dead after being shot by one of Simmons' soldiers, Carla attempts a final attack against Ada, after having injected herself with a powerful dose of the C-virus, but is killed. Ada aids Leon and Helena in their battle with Simmons to kill him, and destroys the lab where her clone was developed before accepting a new assignment. Leon and Helena are cleared for duty; Chris remains with the BSAA in command of a new squad, overcoming his guilt; Sherry continues her duty as a DSO agent; and Jake starts a new life fighting B.O.W.s in an underdeveloped country with his identity covered up by the BSAA.

Development and release

Resident Evil 6 was conceptualized soon after the release of Resident Evil 5, and entered full development in 2009. Resident Evil 5 producer Jun Takeuchi said that he considered a "completely new system" for Resident Evil 6, but ruled out his involvement. In March 2009, co-producer Masachika Kawata stated that the new installment was not decided upon, but admitted that it could take Capcom four to eight years to develop. Kawata later claimed that the new game will be drastically different from its predecessors. The game was directed by Eiichiro Sasaki, who also directed the Resident Evil Outbreak series. When development of the game first begun, producer Yoshiaki Hirabayashi wanted to revolve the game around the "ultimate horror entertainment", bearing in mind that the team considered the upcoming Resident Evil 6 to be the flagship title of the horror genre. In a February 2012 interview, Hirabayashi stated that he went to lengths to balance "all of the things people love" about the series, so the team focused to orientate gameplay around horror themes. In March 2012, Capcom admitted that it believed the survival-horror market was too small for Resident Evil, and issued a statement that the development team would instead choose to orientate the gameplay around the action genre.

The development of the game was led by Hiroyuki Kobayashi, who was stated by Capcom to be aiming to "deliver the most impressive Resident Evil title ever both in terms of scope and production values". Capcom also asserted that the game was meant to take an approach to "evolve" the series. The staff wanted to give the game a new setting with Sasaki wishing to place it in China. While the country of Edonia was not modelled from any country in Europe, it was given an Eastern European theme. According to Famitsu, the character of Jake Muller was designed to be "someone today's young people can empathize with". The game had a development staff of more than 600, making it Capcom's largest production to date. The decision to bring back zombies into Resident Evil 6 was made by Kobayashi, who felt that they were a popular component for the franchise, as well as complying per fans' requests. Hirabayashi admitted that the game had radically changed at the end of the development cycle, due to the new concepts it introduced to the series. On 21 August 2012, Resident Evil 6 went gold and initiated its online service.

An official trailer was released on 19 January 2012. At a Microsoft press briefing at E3 2012, the first gameplay demonstration was shown, depicting Leon and Helena fighting hordes of zombies in China. A playable demo of Resident Evil 6 was scheduled for release on the PlayStation Network and Xbox Live Marketplace on 5 September 2012. Capcom later announced that the demo would become available for both Xbox 360 and PlayStation 3 owners on 18 September 2012. Early access to the demo was included with Dragon's Dogma. As a result of criticism of the first demo, Capcom brought a different version of the demo to the 2012 San Diego Comic-Con, modifying various parts of its gameplay. Originally scheduled to be released on 20 November 2012, the game's release date was pushed forward to 2 October 2012. Prior to the game's launch, several copies of the game were stolen and were sold in Poland.

Resident Evil 6 was also contained in Biohazard Anniversary Package, a special edition for Resident Evils seventeenth anniversary released in Japan on 22 March 2013 alongside the PC version. Resident Evil 6 was re-released on PlayStation 4 and Xbox One with graphical enhancements and all DLC on 29 March 2016. It was released on the Nintendo Switch on October 29, 2019.

Downloadable content
In response to a public backlash over classifying on-disc content as downloadable content (DLC), Capcom released a patch in December 2012 free of charge. The patch included new camera controls, a new difficulty mode named "No Hope", an option to play Ada's campaign without having to complete the other three, and the addition of an online co-op partner for Ada's campaign simply called "Agent". Unlike any other character in the game, Agent cannot interact with doors and treasure chests; he also disappears when cutscenes are triggered.

On 18 December 2012, a new multiplayer (DLC) was released with three new multiplayer modes: "Predator", "Survivors" and "Onslaught". Predator mode is a series of quick fire rounds with up to six players who take turns as the fearsome Ustanak and have full access to its weapons. The other players in "Predator" mode must avoid capture and being killed by the Ustanak. Human players score points for successful attacks, but also lose points for being caught and/or taken down. This match type is over once all have played as the Ustanak, with the participant with the most points crowned as the winner. Survivors mode is Resident Evils take on the classic solo and team based deathmatch mode. Survivors is available for 2 to 6 players. Onslaught is a two player mode where each must clear waves of oncoming enemies. The twist comes when a player completes a combo chain as this will send enemies over to their opponent's screen.

On 4 April 2013, a Left 4 Dead 2 crossover DLC was released for the PC version, adding the main characters and two monsters from Left 4 Dead 2 to the PC-exclusive The Mercenaries: No Mercy mode in Resident Evil 6. Various weapons, characters and monsters from Resident Evil 6 have also been added as optionally-downloadable replacement skins on the PC version of Left 4 Dead 2.

Reception

According to review aggregator website Metacritic, Resident Evil 6 received "mixed or average" reviews. The website described the game as "the first game in the main series that failed to receive a positive reception from game critics" and reported that the critics "complained about bloat and inconsistency", and felt that "RE6 was more generic shooter than distinctive survival horror game."

Critics praised the graphics, AI and controls. A reviewer from Game Informer stated that the game did not "hold back" the decadent experience from being an "unhinged flaming rollercoaster ride". A reviewer from the Official Xbox Magazine concluded that the game was an accomplished shooter, and a fittingly "thunderous" send-off for Resident Evil, while also praising the length and variety of the game. GameTrailers noted the shift away from the style and tone of past games in the series, yet still praised the overall direction, stating that despite the "old identity stripped away", the game presented itself as a "massive" action game. Richard George of IGN was favourable toward the technical and artistic design of the game, stating that the game was among Capcom's greatest successes with an "incredibly strong" world, lighting and creature designs. Ryan McCaffrey of IGN also noted the new enemies as "some of the best" designs and concepts in the history of the franchise. Hollander Cooper of GamesRadar praised the improvements to the controls over its predecessor, stating that the game had an emphasis placed on fluidity and movement, although noted that the cover system "never seems to work right". The Escapist also praised the improved AI companion that "does a decent job of backing you up and taking the fight to the enemy rather than just standing by", while, however, disliking the cover system, calling it "the most forgettable new feature of the game". Jose Otero of 1Up.com also praised the improvements to the game's controls but stated: "While building on that game's (Resident Evil 4's) masterful formula of stop-and-pop gunplay is a smart approach, RE6 serves as proof that too many compromises and too much empowerment can ultimately erode what makes Resident Evil, at its core, work."

The game's four campaigns received criticism from reviewers. Simon Parkin from Eurogamer was divided over the campaigns, citing Leon's campaign as the strongest and "the closest we get to the series' survival horror roots", along with Ada's as having "diverse flavour". However, Parkin criticised the other two campaigns, stating that Jake's campaign "rarely delights" while citing that Chris's was a "second-rate third-person sprint" with "idiotic" cutscene dialogue. A reviewer from Edge also felt that the campaigns noticeably contrasted in quality more than others. Similarly, Kevin VanOrd from GameSpot concluded that the game's campaigns were the ultimate test of patience for "even the most dedicated", while Destructoid cited Resident Evil 6 as not only a "step back" for the series due to the game's new and unconventional features, but a "step back for commonplace, unassuming action-shooters".

In an interview with the Official PlayStation Blog, Resident Evil 6 executive producer Hiroyuki Kobayashi responded to fan criticism shortly after release, noting the creative differences with fans. He stated "the fans and us as creators are the two parents [...] and just like real parents, you're not always going to agree on what is best for raising that child," going on to say, "we want to make sure that what we do pleases them but the initial reaction might not always be positive. We do listen to the fans but we can't be beholden to them at every turn or I don't think we'll ever make progress in terms of the series' development".

While Capcom dubbed the game a "dramatic horror", several critics noted its departure from the survival horror genre compared to previous instalments, and listed the genre simply as an action shooter. Resident Evil 7: Biohazard, released in 2017, switched to a first-person perspective and returned to the series' survival horror roots.

Sales
In May 2012, Capcom announced they expected the game to sell 7 million copies by the end of the 2012 fiscal year; however, the company lowered their expectations to 6 million due to the game's mixed reception. Capcom announced that it had shipped 4.5 million copies worldwide, setting a new record for the company. In October 2012, the game sold 806,000 copies in the United States. According to Capcom, sales weakened following the strong start, with the company admitting that the game would not meet their goals, and consequently lowered their financial projections for the fiscal year.

Resident Evil 6 had sold 4.9 million copies by April 2013; by October had sold 5.2 million copies worldwide, becoming one of Capcom's best-selling games. Resident Evil 6 became Capcom's fourth-best-selling game by December 2020, with a lifetime sales of 7.7 million copies worldwide for the PlayStation 3 and Xbox 360 of its first single release. In February 2013, Capcom said in a statement that the game suffered from poor sales due to various development challenges and "inadequate organisational collaboration" across the company. The PlayStation 4 and Xbox One versions have sold 2.3 million copies as of December 2020.

Notes

References

External links

NoHopeLeft.com, an alternate reality game promotion of the game

2012 video games
Action-adventure games
Apocalyptic video games
Asymmetrical multiplayer video games
Bioterrorism in fiction
Cooperative video games
Multiplayer and single-player video games
Nintendo Switch games
PlayStation 3 games
PlayStation 4 games
Resident Evil games
Third-person shooters
Video game sequels
Video games about cloning
Video games about police officers
Video games developed in Japan
Video games featuring female protagonists
Video games scored by Akihiko Narita
Video games set in 2012
Video games set in 2013
Video games set in a fictional country
Video games set in China
Video games set in Eastern Europe
Video games set in the United States
Video games with downloadable content
Windows games
Xbox 360 games
Xbox One games
2010s horror video games